Loza is a surname with multiple etymologies. Notable people with the surname include:

Boris Loza (born 1960), Canada-based Russian cybersecurity expert
Dmitry Loza (1922–2001), Soviet-Ukrainian colonel
Efrain Loza (1939–2017), Mexican footballer
Halina Buyno-Łoza (1907–1991), Polish actress
Jamar Loza (born 1994), Jamaican footballer
Kyle Loza (born 1986), American freestyle motocross rider
Melissa Loza, Peruvian model
Mieczysław Łoza (1916–1982), Polish actor
Petro Loza (born 1979), Ukrainian Greek-Catholic bishop
Remedios Loza (1949–2018), Bolivian politician
Rito Romero Loza (1927–2001), Mexican wrestler
Rodolfo Loza (born 1933), Argentine boxer
Santiago Loza (born 1971), Argentine film director
Stanisław Łoza (1573–1639), Polish Roman Catholic prelate
Steven Loza (born 1952), American musicologist
Verónica Loza (born 1973), Uruguayan artist and singer
Yuri Loza (born 1954), Russian musician

See also
 

Polish-language surnames

Spanish-language surnames

Ukrainian-language surnames